Philippe Elebe ma Ekonzo (7 July 1933 or 7 July 1937 – 16 January 2003) was a Congolese diplomat and civil servant.

Career in the Belgian Congo 
Elebe ma Ekonzo followed secondary education at Saint Joseph College in Léopoldville, in 1952.

Career in the independent Congo/Zaire 
At the time of independence, Elebe ma Ekonzo became an adviser in the cabinet of the Minister of Economic Coordination and Planning, Aloïs Kabangi. From 1966 to 1972, he was the Director of the national press agency .

In December 1972, Elebe ma Ekonzo was appointed the Zairean Ambassador to Belgium. On the occasion of the publication of Jules Chomé's anti-Mobutist book L'ascension de Mobutu in Belgium in 1974, Elebe ma Ekonzo was recalled for consultations. Six months later, he was reinstated in Brussels.

From 1975 to 1977, he became the Director of AZAP once again, before being appointed to the Political Bureau of the state party Popular Movement of the Revolution (Mouvement populaire de la révolution, MPR). From 1980 to 1982, he was State Commissioner for National Orientation, Culture, and Arts. Finally, in 1983, he became a member of the powerful MPR organ Central Committee (Comité central).

Family 
Philippe Elebe ma Ekonzo is the father of author Tony Elebe ma Ekonzo.

Honours 
: National Order of the Leopard (Grand Officer)
: Order of the Crown (Grand Cross)

References 

People of the Congo Crisis
Government ministers of the Democratic Republic of the Congo
Ambassadors of the Democratic Republic of the Congo to Belgium
21st-century Democratic Republic of the Congo people
2003 deaths